The 1994–95 Gamma Ethniki was the 12th season since the official establishment of the third tier of Greek football in 1983. Doxa Vyronas and Kastoria were crowned champions in Southern and Northern Group respectively, thus winning promotion to Beta Ethniki. Panelefsiniakos and Trikala also won promotion as a runners-up of the groups.

Acharnaikos, Egaleo, Messolonghi, Sparti, Kilkisiakos, Pandramaikos, Iraklis Ptolemaida and Acheron Kanallaki were relegated to Delta Ethniki.

Southern Group

League table

Northern Group

League table

References

Third level Greek football league seasons
3
Greece